The Immediate Geographic Region of Poços de Caldas is one of the 10 immediate geographic regions in the Intermediate Geographic Region of Pouso Alegre, one of the 70 immediate geographic regions in the Brazilian state of Minas Gerais and one of the 509 of Brazil, created by the National Institute of Geography and Statistics (IBGE) in 2017.

Municipalities 
It comprises 8 municipalities.

 Andradas    
 Bandeira do Sul  
 Botelhos  
 Caldas  
 Campestre    
 Ibitiúra de Minas   
 Poços de Caldas  
 Santa Rita de Caldas

See also 

 List of Intermediate and Immediate Geographic Regions of Minas Gerais

References 

Geography of Minas Gerais